The architecture of Belfast comprises architectural styles ranging from Georgian through to modernist buildings such as the Waterfront Hall and Titanic Belfast. The city's Victorian and Edwardian buildings are notable for their display of a large number of sculptures. Many of Belfast's Victorian era landmarks, including the main Lanyon Building at Queens University, were designed by Sir Charles Lanyon.

Chronology and styles

Belfast became a substantial settlement in the 17th century, after being established as a town by Sir Arthur Chichester. None of the buildings from Belfast's first century as a market town on the river Farset survive today. The only significant structures in those early years from 1613 would have been a castle established by Sir Arthur Chichester, and the parish church at the foot of High Street, where a 'chapel of the ford' had been erected by 1306, and where St George's church now stands.

Georgian

Victorian

20th century

Edwardian

Pre-World War II and Art Deco

Late 20th century

21st century 

In 2011 and 2012 Belfast saw the creation of two buildings described as "two of the most stunning new British buildings of the century", namely the Lyric Theatre (2011) by Irish architects O’Donnell and Tuomey, and the Metropolitan Arts Centre (2012) by local architectural practice Hackett Hall McKnight. In contrast, the new boat-shaped Titanic Museum (2012) was described by The Telegraph as "startlingly inane".

See also

 List of parks and gardens in Belfast
 List of tallest buildings and structures in Belfast
 Buildings and structures in Belfast

References

Notes

Bibliography

External links
Communities-NI Buildings Database
Archiseek - Belfast Architecture
Future Belfast
Culture NI - The Architecture of Belfast
University of Ulster Belfast School of Architecture
Queen's University School of Planning Architecture and CivilEngineering (SPACE)

Buildings and structures in Belfast
Belfast